Excalibur Publications, doing business as Excalibur and sometimes referred to as Excal is the community newspaper of York University, in Toronto, Canada.

Having served the York University community since 1964, it is an autonomous newspaper that publishes campus-related affairs within York University and its community. Its main focus is to serve the student population at York. Distributed on newsracks across the university, the newspaper sources its content from student volunteers. Additionally, the paper comprises a sports editor, a health editor, and an arts editor.

The tabloid paper prints September through April of the academic school year at York University, and takes breaks through the summer. Excalibur features both online and printed versions of their weekly-issued news releases.

Recognitions

Excalibur was awarded in 2010 with Newspaper Pacemaker Award by the Associated Collegiate Press.

In 2010, Excalibur was also awarded by the Associated Collegiate Press with the Best of Show Award at a rank of fifth place.

See also
List of student newspapers in Canada
List of newspapers in Canada

References

External links 
 

Publications established in 1964
Student newspapers published in Ontario
Newspapers published in Toronto
York University
Weekly newspapers published in Ontario
1964 establishments in Ontario